Peter Clinch (1753 – July 31, 1816) was an Irish-born political figure in New Brunswick. He represented Charlotte in the Legislative Assembly of New Brunswick from 1785 to 1795.

He was educated at Trinity College in Dublin and came to America before the American Revolution. Clinch served as a lieutenant in the Royal Fencible Americans during the revolution. He settled in St. George, New Brunswick in 1783, receiving a land grant in Charlotte County in 1784. Clinch became a magistrate and organized a militia company. He died at St. George.

His son Patrick also represented Charlotte in the assembly.

Clinch is considered a founding father of St. George.

References 

1753 births
1816 deaths
Members of the Legislative Assembly of New Brunswick
Irish emigrants to pre-Confederation New Brunswick
Colony of New Brunswick people
Colony of New Brunswick judges